Trochilus is a genus of hummingbirds which comprises the streamertails.

Trochilus or Trochilos may also refer to:

 Trochilus (mythology), a member of the Argive royal house in Greek mythology
 Trochilus (crocodile bird), a legendary bird, first described by Herodotus

See also 
 Phylloscopus trochilus, the binomial name of the willow warbler.